Sacred waters are sacred natural sites characterized by tangible topographical land formations such as rivers, lakes, springs, reservoirs, and oceans, as opposed to holy water which is water elevated with the sacramental blessing of a cleric. These organic bodies of water have attained religious significance not from the modern alteration or blessing, but were sanctified through mythological or historical figures. Sacred waters have been exploited for cleansing, healing, initiations, and death rites.

Ubiquitous and perpetual fixations with water occur across religious traditions. It tends to be a central element in the creations accounts of almost every culture with mythological, cosmological, and theological myths. In this way, many groups characterize water as "living water", or the "water of life". This means that it gives life and is the fundamental element from which life arises. Each religious or cultural group that feature waters as sacred substances tends to favor certain categorizations of some waters more than others, usually those that are most accessible to them and that best integrate into their rituals.

Rivers

Ganges River 
While all rivers are sacred in Hinduism, the Ganges River (Ganga) is particularly revered. In the Vedic myths, the goddess Ganga descended upon the earth to purify and prepare the dead. The Ganges in India is seen as the physical embodiment of this goddess. Since the river waters are as both inherently pure themselves and having major purificatory qualities, people come to bathe in them, drink from them, leave offerings for them, and give their physical remains to them.

The Ganges is said to purify the soul of negative karma, corporeal sins, and even impurities from previous lives. At sunrise along the Ganges, pilgrims descend the ghat steps to drink of the waters, bathe themselves in the waters and perform ablutions where they submerge their entire bodies. These practitioners desire to imbibe and surround themselves with the Ganges’s waters so that they can be purified. Hindu conceptualizations of the sacred are fluid and renewable. Purity and pollution exist upon a continuum where most entities, including people, can become sacred and then become stagnated and full of sin once again. Performing these rituals is also an act to become closer to the Hindu deities, and ultimately the Divine.

The Ganges is one of the most highly favored sites for funerary rituals in India. It is presumed that if a deceased person is cleansed by the Ganges, it will help liberate their soul, or expedite the number of lives they need to achieve this. In the traditional funerary ceremony, a dead person is placed upon a funeral pyre until the body becomes cremated, then the ashes are sent upon the river. Many Hindus go to great lengths to purify themselves one last time before death. When this is not possible, family members will actually mail the ashes to a priest so that he can perform the ceremony of entering the waters.

Manu, the mythic law giver, gave directives and prohibitions regarding the river: “impure objects like urine, feces, spit; or anything which has these elements, blood, or poison should not be cast into the water”. Few or none of his directives hold forth along most places down the Ganges today. Journalist Joshua Hammer wrote a very illustrative account of his personal visit to the Ganges in which he described seeing both animal and human corpses floating down the river or sometimes embedded in heaps of garbage. People continued to bathe, and children to play in very murky waters; the color in some parts completely changed from toxic sewage and runoff. As the Ganges River remains interwoven into daily existence, Hindus are vulnerable to urban contamination. Irony lies in that this river is venerated for her ability to wash away contaminants, yet is being stagnated.

Lakes and underground water

Lake Titicaca 
Lake Titicaca is widely known as being a sacred place for the Inca people. The Inca Empire origins lie in Lake Titicaca. Ancient Incan myths describe the Incas as being blessed by the sun because the sun first emerged from Lake Titicaca. Since then, the sun organizes social order and the movement of the sun organizes rituals and gatherings. The first emergence of people in the time of the sun emergence is said to be the elite in their caste system. The origin of the elite was and continues to be contested among the people on the Island of Lake Titicaca. Thus, creating competition to become part of the elite rank. In recent times, the pollution of Lake Titicaca has built up and caused an increase of green algae. The people of Lake Titicaca Special Projects continuously are creating ways to bring awareness to the importance of a clean lake for their society.

Chichen Itza 
The ancient Maya people valued social order and their society flourished because of the structure of their order. The ancient Maya strived and focused their actions on pleasing their many gods. Essentially, the Maya believed that the world consisted of three layers: the watery underworld, the middle earthly realm, and the sky realm. The Maya viewed bodies of water as a direct connection to the watery underworld and underground water obtained through a cave as an even better connection to spirits and deities. Cenotes are very important to the Mayas. The famous Sacred Cenote at Chichen Itza proves to be important with the many findings of artifacts and skeletal remains. Sacrifices were common at this site among the ancient Maya. Different people were sacrificed and findings show that most of the people were men and children. Like any archeological site, looting is problem in preserving and studying the cenote at Chichen Itza.

Black Mesa 
The Navajo and Hopi people have long embraced the water underneath and around the Black Mesa area as sacred to their people. The people have long lived around and became dependent on springs and wells of the Black Mesa. These waters are the only source of drinking water, water for livestock, and water for agriculture for the Navajo and Hopi people. In respect for the water, these people carryout religious and ceremonial tributes to the water of the Black Mesa. These waters have organized their people around the Black Mesa and resulted in the reliance of the waters for all aspects of their lives. With the emergence of Peabody Energy came threats to the preservation of their sacred water. Peabody Energy pumps water out from underneath the Black Mesa to transport their mining minerals. In May 2002 the Navajo and Hopi people from northeastern Arizona joined their people in St. Louis Missouri to fight against Peabody Energy and its shareholders. In January 2002 Peabody proposed and was granted the right to use thirty-two percent more Navajo Aquifer (Naquifer) water than they had already been using. The significant increase in water pumped out of the Naquifer, dramatically affected the drinkability of the water from the springs and wells connected to the Naquifer. Before the significant increase of pumping, the water was clean enough to drink without any kind of purification. Another result of the pumping is the noticeable drop in the water levels of the springs and wells. The drop in water levels was almost immediately recognized after Peabody was granted permission to pump out more water. This had caused disruption in the ceremonial and cultural lives of the Navajo and Hopi people as well as disruption to their farming.

See also 

 General
 
 
 
 
 
 
 
 

 Locations

 
 
 
 
 
 , site of a sacred spring

References

Works cited 

 
 
 
 
 
 
 
 
 
 
 
 
 
 
 

Water and religion
Holiness
Religious places